Covering the Bases is the debut album by Major League Baseball pitcher Bronson Arroyo. It was released in 2005 following the Boston Red Sox 2004 World Series Championship, which Arroyo was a part of.

The album features cover versions of twelve songs — mainly modern rock hits — that Arroyo would play for his teammates while in the locker room and on the road. Musicians involved in the album included prolific studio guitarist Michael Landau, Alice in Chains/Ozzy Osbourne bassist Mike Inez, Red Sox general manager Theo Epstein, and a small spoken word part during "Everlong" by author Stephen King.

Track listing

"Slide" by Goo Goo Dolls – 3:32
"Down in a Hole" by Alice in Chains* – 5:53
"The Freshmen" by The Verve Pipe – 4:27
"Everlong" by Foo Fighters (featuring Stephen King) – 4:07
"Black" by Pearl Jam – 5:26
"Pardon Me" by Incubus – 3:38
"Something's Always Wrong" by Toad the Wet Sprocket – 5:27
"Plush" by Stone Temple Pilots – 5:00
"Shimmer" by Fuel – 3:14
"Hunger Strike" by Temple of the Dog – 	3:59
"Best I Ever Had (Grey Sky Morning)" by Vertical Horizon – 4:30
"Dirty Water" by The Standells (featuring Johnny Damon, Kevin Millar, and Kevin Youkilis) – 3:56
 
 *Note: "Down in a Hole" by Alice in Chains is listed as "Down in the Hole".

Personnel

Musicians
 Bronson Arroyo - vocals, vocals (background), percussion, spoken word
 Kenny Aronoff - drums
 Leland Sklar- bass
 Mike Inez - bass
 Michael Landau- electric guitar 
 Tim Pierce - acoustic rhythm guitar, mandolin 
 John "JT" Thomas - Hammond B3, strings, Wurlitzer 
 Amy Keys - vocals
 Kevin Youkilis -  vocals (background)
 Terry Wood -  vocals (background)
 Carmen Twillie -  vocals (background)
 Clydene Jackson -  vocals (background)
 David Isaacs - vocals (background)
 Lenny Dinardo - vocals (background)
 Johnny Damon - vocals (background)
 Stephen King - spoken word

Production
 Lorren Harriet - producer
 Tally Sherwood - engineer, mixing
 Danny Bernini - engineer
 Stephen Marcussen - Mastering
 Bronson Arroyo - Executive Producer
 Terry Bross - Executive Producer
 E.K. Gaylord - Executive Producer
 Richard Thomas Jennings - Layout Design
 Louie Mann - Marketing, Project Coordinator
 Kevin Mazur - Photography

References

2005 debut albums